Lauren Klein is an American academic who works as an associate professor, and director of the Digital Humanities Lab at Emory University. 
Klein is best known for her work in digital humanities and for co-authoring the book Data Feminism with Catherine D'Ignazio.

Early life and education 

Klein studied comparative literature and computer science at Harvard University. Before returning to graduate school, she worked as a software developer and bike messenger. She received her Ph.D. in English and American Studies from the Graduate Center, CUNY in 2011.

Career and research 

Klein joined the School of Literature, Media, and Communication at the Georgia Institute of Technology as an assistant professor, where she taught in the Computational Media program. She also founded the Digital Humanities Lab there. Her lab’s work on the Shape of History project brought new attention to the forgotten data visualization scheme created by Elizabeth Palmer Peabody in the nineteenth century. In 2017, she was named one of the "rising stars of digital humanities" by Inside Higher Ed.

Klein’s research, which combines quantitative methods and archival research, proposes a way to "integrate race, gender, and postcolonial theory with computer learning to develop methodologies for performing research in bias-laden archives." She is the author of An Archive of Taste: Race and Eating in the Early United States, which was published by the University of Minnesota Press. She is the co-author, with Catherine D’Ignazio, of Data Feminism, which was published MIT Press. Data Feminism was named a "must-read" book by WIRED Magazine and a 2021 PROSE Award finalist. Klein is also co-editor, with Matthew K. Gold, of the Debates in the Digital Humanities book series, a "digital humanities bellwether" which offers a "hybrid model for open-access texts to be published in both experimental online spaces and traditional print forms."

In 2019, Klein joined Emory University as an associate professor of English and Quantitative Theory and Methods.

Works
 with Catherine D'Ignazio, Data Feminism (2020)
 An Archive of Taste: Race and Eating in the Early United States (2020)

References

American women academics
Harvard University alumni
Graduate Center, CUNY alumni
Georgia Tech faculty
Emory University faculty
Date of birth missing (living people)
Living people
21st-century American non-fiction writers
American feminist writers
Data scientists
Women data scientists
People in digital humanities
Year of birth missing (living people)
21st-century American women writers